The Ingersoll–Tutton Building is a historic structure located at 832 5th Avenue in San Diego's Gaslamp Quarter, in the U.S. state of California. It was built in 1894.

See also
 List of Gaslamp Quarter historic buildings

External links

 

1894 establishments in California
Buildings and structures completed in 1894
Buildings and structures in San Diego
Gaslamp Quarter, San Diego